PK-15 Lower Dir-III is a constituency for the Khyber Pakhtunkhwa Assembly of the Khyber Pakhtunkhwa province of Pakistan.

Elections 2013
The following table shows the names of candidates, their parties and the votes they secured in the general elections held on May 11, 2013.

See also
 PK-14 Lower Dir-II
 PK-16 Lower Dir-IV

References

External links 
 Khyber Pakhtunkhwa Assembly's official website
 Election Commission of Pakistan's official website
 Awaztoday.com Search Result
 Election Commission Pakistan Search Result

Khyber Pakhtunkhwa Assembly constituencies